Headwaters Inc provides products, technologies, and services to construction materials, coal combustion products, and alternative energy industries in the United States.

Companies formerly listed on the New York Stock Exchange
Building materials companies of the United States